Nikolaus Wolfgang Fischer (15 January 1782 – 19 August 1850) was a German chemist. He first synthesized the Potassium cobaltinitritelater used as Aureolin pigment.

References

1782 births
1850 deaths
19th-century German chemists